Prof Rodney Robert Porter, CH, FRS FRSE HFRCP (8 October 1917 – 6 September 1985) was a British biochemist and Nobel laureate.

Education and early life
He was born in Newton-le-Willows, Lancashire, England, the son of Joseph Lawrence Porter, chief clerk of the Railway Carriage and Wagon Works in Earlestown (Newton-le-Willows), and his wife, Isabel May Reese. He was educated at Ashton-in-Makerfield Grammar School.

Rodney Robert Porter received his Bachelor of Science degree from the University of Liverpool in 1939 for Biochemistry.

His career was interrupted by the Second World War during which he served as a 2nd Lieutenant in the Royal Engineers serving in Sicily and North Africa. In 1944 he was promoted to Major and transferred to the Royal Army Service Corps acting as a War Department analyst, based in Naples in Italy.

After the war he moved to the University of Cambridge where he became Fred Sanger's first PhD student. He was awarded his doctorate (PhD) in 1948.

Career and research
Porter worked for the National Institute for Medical Research for eleven years (1949–1960) before joining St. Mary's Hospital Medical School, Imperial College London and becoming the Pfizer Professor of Immunology. In 1967 he was appointed Whitley Professor of Biochemistry at the University of Oxford, and Fellow of Trinity College, Oxford. His colleague Elizabeth Press (Betty Press) worked with him at NIMR, St Mary's and at Oxford contributing extensively to the work which led to the Nobel Prize.

Awards and honours
Porter was elected a Fellow of the Royal Society (FRS) in 1964. He won the Gairdner Foundation International Award  in  1966. In 1972, Porter shared the Nobel Prize in Physiology or Medicine with Gerald M. Edelman for determining the chemical structure of an antibody. Using the enzyme papain, he broke the blood's immunoglobin into fragments, making them easier to study. He also looked into how the blood's immunoglobins react with cellular surfaces.
He subsequently worked with colleagues Kenneth BM Reid, Robert Sim and Duncan Campbell on developing understanding of the Complement Proteins associated with defence against infection.

In 1991, Raymond Dwek founded the Oxford Glycobiology Institute at the Department of Biochemistry, University of Oxford and this building was named after Porter as the Rodney Porter building. The department organises the Rodney Porter Memorial Lecture every year.

Family

In 1948 he married Julia New. They had five children together.

Death
Porter died following a four car accident on 6 September 1985, near Beacon Hill outside Guildford, as the driver of one of the cars. Julia was only slightly injured in the accident. They had been en route to France for a holiday, just prior to his formal retirement.

References

External links
 

1917 births
1985 deaths
People from Newton-le-Willows
Alumni of the University of Liverpool
Nobel laureates in Physiology or Medicine
British Nobel laureates
English physiologists
English biochemists
Academics of Imperial College London
Fellows of the Royal Society
Foreign associates of the National Academy of Sciences
Road incident deaths in England
Royal Medal winners
Recipients of the Copley Medal
English Nobel laureates
National Institute for Medical Research faculty
Whitley Professors of Biochemistry
Physicians of St Mary's Hospital, London
British Army personnel of World War II
Royal Engineers officers
Royal Army Service Corps officers